Shamsabad (also Romanized as Shamsābād; also known as Samsūlābād, Shams Abad Barakooh, Shamsollāhābād, and Shamsulābād) is a village in Baqeran Rural District, in the Central District of Birjand County, South Khorasan Province, Iran. At the 2006 census, its population was 189, in 49 families.

References 

Populated places in Birjand County